Robert Lee Watson (August 8, 1942 – December 13, 1977) was an American basketball coach. He was in his first season as a head coach for the Evansville Purple Aces men's basketball team when he and his team were killed in the 1977 Air Indiana Flight 216 crash.

Watson was a college basketball player for the VMI Keydets and began his coaching career at a Virginia high school. His early coaching career was interrupted by two stints in the Vietnam War but he returned as an assistant coach for the Xavier Musketeers. Watson first came to prominence as the head coach for the Ferrum Panthers from 1971 to 1973. He worked as an assistant coach for the Wake Forest Demon Deacons and the Oral Roberts Golden Eagles. Watson was hired as the head coach of the Purple Aces in 1977 for their first season as a member of NCAA Division I competition and had amassed a 1–3 record at the time of his death.

College and military career
Watson was a star basketball and baseball player while he attended Bethel Park High School in Bethel Park, Pennsylvania, and was offered a basketball scholarship to attend the Virginia Military Institute. He played college basketball for the VMI Keydets from 1961 to 1964, where he led the team in rebounds during his sophomore and senior seasons. Watson served as a team captain during his senior season when the Keydets won the 1964 Southern Conference championship.

Instead of playing professionally, Watson embarked on a coaching career immediately after the end of his college stint and was hired by William Fleming High School in Roanoke, Virginia. Watson entered the United States Army in 1965 and served two tours in the Vietnam War as a member of the 101st Airborne Division. He was shot out of a helicopter three times and once narrowly escaped death when his disabled helicopter fell 75 feet into a rice paddy field, which cushioned the crash. Watson was awarded two Bronze Star Medals, the Commendation Medal and five Purple Hearts.

Coaching career

Assistant roles and Ferrum College
After his first eighteen-month Vietnam tour, he served as an assistant coach for the Xavier Musketeers for one season. He returned to the Musketeers after his second Vietnam stint in 1969. Watson was highly regarded for his prospect recruiting abilities while serving under head coach George Krajack, who had personally recruited Watson to the program.  When Krajack resigned in 1971, Watson also left the Musketeers out of loyalty to Krajack.

Watson desired a head coaching role and discovered a vacancy at Ferrum College while reading a newspaper. He served as the head coach for the Ferrum Panthers men's basketball team from 1971 to 1973 and amassed a 61–8 record. Watson's success at Ferrum brought him national attention, including a head coaching offer from the Musketeers. He instead accepted an offer to become an assistant coach for the Wake Forest Demon Deacons and served there from 1973 to 1974. In 1974, he was hired as an assistant coach for the Oral Roberts Golden Eagles.

Evansville
Watson was offered the head coaching job for the Evansville Purple Aces in 1977 after the previous candidate, Jerry Sloan, had turned down the offer following a week with the program. It was the Aces' first season in 31 years without head coach Arad McCutchan, who had led the team to five NCAA Division II championships. It was also the team's first season as a member of NCAA Division I and Watson entered the program with high expectations. Watson promised to stay with the  Aces "as long as [they] will have me."

Watson had an excellent recruitment period and signed nine freshmen to join the team for the 1977–78 season, whom he believed to be "as fine a nucleus as we could have brought in for the coming years." He also launched public relation campaigns with local community leaders to improve ticket sales and ultimately sold 1,000 new season tickets in the few weeks after he was hired. Evansville business manager Bob Hudson stated, "I've never seen a man work so hard or more so fast." Watson came to be seen by Aces supporters as the savior of their program.

The Aces lost their first two games of the season to the Western Kentucky Hilltoppers and the DePaul Blue Demons. Their first and only win of the season came on December 6, 1977, against the Pittsburgh Panthers. After the game, Watson remarked, "I've been involved in a lot of wins, but few sweeter than that one." The Aces' final game was a loss on December 10, 1977, against the Indiana State Sycamores. After the game, Watson stated that his team needed more courage and mental toughness when playing away games.

On December 13, 1977, the Purple Aces were to fly to Nashville, Tennessee, to play the Middle Tennessee Blue Raiders the following night. The Aces teams under McCutchan would often travel to away games on the same day, but Watson preferred to fly a day early to allow his players to practice on the host's court. The team's plane had been delayed by three hours due to bad weather. Shortly after take-off at around 7:20pm from the Evansville Regional Airport, the plane suffered an engine failure and crashed, which killed all 29 people on board. Watson was the only coach on board the flight as his assistant coaches were on scouting assignments at the time. The University of Evansville cancelled the rest of the Purple Aces' season after briefly considering carrying on with a substitute team, which Evansville athletic director Jim Byers stated would be what Watson would have wanted.

Legacy
Watson was inducted into the Evansville Purple Aces Hall of Fame in 1978 and the Ferrum College Alumni Sports Hall of Fame in 1997. Ferrum College offers the Bobby Watson Endowed Scholarship, which is awarded to students with an interest in athletics.

References

External links
Coaching record

1942 births
1977 deaths
United States Army personnel of the Vietnam War
American men's basketball coaches
American men's basketball players
Basketball players from Pennsylvania
Basketball coaches from Pennsylvania
Evansville Purple Aces men's basketball coaches
Ferrum Panthers men's basketball coaches
High school basketball coaches in Virginia
People from Bethel Park, Pennsylvania
Victims of aviation accidents or incidents in the United States
VMI Keydets basketball players
Wake Forest Demon Deacons men's basketball coaches
Xavier Musketeers men's basketball coaches